General William Stanhope, 2nd Earl of Harrington (18 December 1719 – 1 April 1779) was a British politician and soldier.

The son of William Stanhope, 1st Earl of Harrington, he took up a military career and joined the Foot Guards in 1741, and was also returned for Aylesbury. He was wounded at the battle of Fontenoy and shortly thereafter (5 June 1745) was appointed colonel of the Second Troop of Horse Grenadier Guards, an appointment he held for the remainder of his life.

He married Lady Caroline FitzRoy (1722–1784), daughter of Charles FitzRoy, 2nd Duke of Grafton, on 11 August 1746. They had seven children:
 Lady Caroline Stanhope (11 March 1747 – 9 February 1767), married Kenneth Mackenzie, 1st Earl of Seaforth
 Lady Isabella Stanhope (c. 1748 – 29 January 1819), married Charles Molyneux, 1st Earl of Sefton
 Lady Amelia Stanhope (24 May 1749 – 5 September 1780), married Richard Barry, 6th Earl of Barrymore
 Charles Stanhope, 3rd Earl of Harrington (1753–1829)
 Capt. Hon. Henry Fitzroy Stanhope (29 May 1754 – 20 August 1828), married Elizabeth Falconer and had issue; he was subject to a court martial in June 1783 over his actions during the invasion of Tobago but was found not guilty. The Lieutenant Governor of the island George Ferguson was also cleared of any blame at a subsequent enquiry. Henry Stanhope went on to become MP for Bramber from February 1782 until 1784.
 Lady Henrietta Stanhope (c. 1756 – 2 January 1781), married Thomas Foley, 2nd Baron Foley
 Lady Anna Maria Stanhope (c. 1760 – 18 October 1834), married first Thomas Pelham-Clinton, 3rd Duke of Newcastle-under-Lyne and second Gen. Sir Charles Craufurd

In 1747, he became MP for Bury St Edmunds, and in 1755, was promoted major-general. He succeeded to the earldom in 1756, and was promoted lieutenant-general in 1758 and general in 1770.

He was known to society as "the goat of quality" for the dissipation of his personal life: he visited the brothel of Sarah Prendergast in King's Place, St James's, London, four times a week. His wife Lady Harrington formed "The New Female Coterie", a group of demimondaines which met in the same house.

References

thePeerage.com

1719 births
1779 deaths
British Army generals
British Life Guards officers
British Army personnel of the War of the Austrian Succession
2
Petersham, William Stanhope, Viscount
British MPs 1741–1747
British MPs 1747–1754
William
Members of Parliament for Coventry
English twins